Pentopetia is a plant genus in the family Apocynaceae, first described as a genus in 1844.

The genus should not be confused with the related genus with a similar name, Petopentia.

Species
all are endemic to Madagascar

Formerly included
Moved to other genera (Cryptolepis, Ischnolepis, Petopentia, Secamone)
 P. albicans now  Cryptolepis albicans
 P. graminifolia now  Ischnolepis graminifolia 
 P. linearifolia now  Secamone geayi 
 P. natalensis now Petopentia natalensis

References

Apocynaceae genera
Endemic flora of Madagascar
Periplocoideae
Taxa named by Joseph Decaisne